Mount Isa City may refer to:

 Mount Isa City, Queensland, the central suburb of the city of Mount Isa in Australia
 City of Mount Isa, the local government area centered on the city of Mount Isa
 Mount Isa, the city itself